Elm Park is an unincorporated community in Maple Ridge Township, Isanti County, Minnesota, United States.

Isanti County Roads 3 and 14 are two of the main routes in the community.

References

 Mn/DOT map of Isanti County – 2013 edition

Unincorporated communities in Minnesota
Unincorporated communities in Isanti County, Minnesota